Jantje Visscher is an American painter, printmaker, photographer, sculptor, teacher, and mentor. Visscher uses geometry and mathematics to explore the dynamics of perception and optical effects through the use of nontraditional mixed media. She is from Minneapolis, MN, and is currently active among the WARM (Women's Art Resources of MN) Mentor Program and the Traffic Zone Center for Visual Art. Visscher is best known for hard-edge abstraction and minimalism within her scientific approach and exploration of perception and mathematics.

Early life and education 
Jantje Visscher obtained her Bachelor of Arts in Political Science at Antioch College in Yellow Springs, Ohio. She later earned her M.F.A in Fine Arts, Painting, and Printmaking from the University of California Berkeley in 1962. After grad school, Visscher returned to Minnesota to take care of her family. It wasn't until 1973, when Visscher joined the WARM collective in MN, an environment and support that Visscher was deeply connected with.

Groups and collectives

WARM (Women's Art Resource of MN) 
Visscher is one of the founding members of WARM, a feminist artist collective based in MN. The collective became an important aspect that shaped and reinforced Visscher as an artist. She now serves as a mentor in the WARM Mentor Program which pairs emerging artists with professional artists. Her philosophy as a mentor includes the practice of constant revision of goals and refocusing within daily life and as an artist. She strives to help protegees develop basic career skills like marketing, drawing, and Photoshop that will help them become successful practicing artists. As a mentor, Visscher also helps proteges develop their art through philosophical discussion, learning technical skills, creating art regularly many more. Visscher is a mixed media artist and has been a part of the WARM Mentor Program in 2015-2016, mentoring artist Kate Vinson, and also in 2013-2014, mentoring artist Maryellen Murphy. Visscher has taken part in both final capstone exhibitions for the WARM Mentor Program, accompanied by her fellow protegees. She exhibited her piece, Capital in the final exhibition Landing and Launching in 2016, and exhibited Making Your Wings in the 2014 final exhibition Beyond the Surface.

Traffic Zone Center for Visual Art 
Visscher is also one of the founding members of Traffic Zone Center for Visual Arts which provides high-quality and affordable studio spaces for artists. Visscher is still active in this community through the Traffic Zone Art’s 22nd Annual Spring Open Studio that will be happening in May 2017.She also had a recent show titled Motion at the Traffic Zone Gallery in January 2017 that runs through the beginning of March 2017. This show features collaged prints that display her fascination with the  “constant motion of everything in the universe”.

Career

Style 
Visscher is fascinated with using various techniques and processes to achieve nonobjective representations. Her style emerged as using geometric principles to create intuitive expression through repetition, limited color palettes, and grids. Visscher introduces a shifting relationship between figure and ground as her experimental constructions invite various perceptions and illusions from her viewers. Visscher's work is reminiscent of the natural sciences and architecture. She uses radiating lines to intersect grids, mimicking moire patterns to create dramatic weaving, swirling, and swelling forms.

Beautiful Lie Landscapes, features diptych photographs of natural landscapes and waves that create an optical illusion when disoriented. Visscher “never gave the subject a thought until she glanced at a photo of a wave a couple of years ago and realized it was upside down but looked right” hence the beginning of her curiosity with orientation and perception. In Dancing In Ligthe ht exhibition, it references Visscher’s interest in “the idea of using a force of nature and light energy, as a drawing material”.

Work

Selected exhibitions 
 2017: Motion, Traffic Zone Center for Visual Art, Minneapolis, MN. 
 2016: Launching and Landing, WARM Mentor-Protegee exhibition, Minneapolis, MN. 
 2007: Dancing In Light, Minnesota Artists Exhibition Program, Minneapolis Institute of Arts, Minneapolis, MN. 
 2006: 12 Artists of the Women’s Art Registry of Minnesota, Weisman Art Museum, Minneapolis, MN.
 2005: Abstract Art in MN, Minnesota Museum of American Art, St. Paul, MN.
 2004: Faculty Exhibit, Women’s Art Institute, Minneapolis College of Art & Design, Minneapolis, MN.
 2003: One by One, Traffic Zone Center for Visual Art, Minneapolis, MN.
 2002: Group exhibition, Bush Foundation, St.Paul, MN.
 2001: Recent Photographs: The Beginning is Also the End, Traffic Zone Center for Visual Art, Minneapolis, MN.
 2000: Emerging Perceptions, College of St. Catherine, St.Paul, MN.

Public collections 
 Walker Art Center, Minneapolis
 First Banks, Minneapolis
 Minneapolis Corporate Institute of Arts; Weisman Museum, Minneapolis
 Minnesota Museum of Collections American Art, St. Paul;
 College of St. Catherine, St. Paul
 KTCA, St. Paul
 University of Oklahoma Museum of Art
 President’s House, Duke University, NC
 Northern States Power, Mpls
 Minneapolis StarTribune
 Grand Met, Mpls offices
 University of Minnesota Hospitals, Mpls
 Morgan Whitney, Mpls
 The Marsh Center, Minnetonka
 Minnesota Historical Society, St. Paul
 College of St. Thomas, St. Paul
 Chamber of Commerce, St. Paul
 College of St. Benedict, St. Joseph, MN
 Stylmark, Fridley, MN

Commissioned work 
 St. Paul, Entrances for the St. Paul Civic Center 1995
 Willmar Technical College, MN for Arts, 1993
 University of Wisconsin, River Falls, WI for Arts 1991
 Willmar Community College, MN for Arts 1991
 Mural for State of Minnesota, Centennial Building, 18 feet, MN forArts 1990
 The state of Minnesota, Department of Finance, MN for Arts 1990
 State of Minnesota, Centennial Building, 3rd floor, MN for Arts 1990

Awards and nominations 
 St. Paul, Civic Center Competition, 1995
 Honors NEA Visual Arts Fellowship 1989
 Minnesota State Arts Board Career Opportunity Grant 1989
 ArtsMidwest/NEA Fellowship 1988
 Bush Foundation Fellowship 1984
 Minnesota State Arts Board Project Grant 1984
 WARM Livingston Griggs Mentor Grants 1981,1986,1991,1997
 Public Art University of St. Thomas, St. Paul, stained glass windows 1997

Bibliography 
 New York Times, About Place, Richard Brenson, 1886
 Minneapolis StarTribune, Mary Abbe, 2000
 Harmonic States, catalog essay, Eleanor Heartney, 1982
 Walker Permanent Collection Catalog, Marge Goldwater, 1988
 PS1, Catalog for About Place, Ed Leffingwell, 1986
 Minneapolis Tribune, Mary Abbe, 2006.

References

External links 
 Jantje Visscher's webpage

Year of birth missing (living people)
Living people
American women painters
Antioch College alumni
UC Berkeley College of Letters and Science alumni
21st-century American women